Ancient Journeys: A Vision of the New World is an album by German cross-cultural new-age band Cusco, released in 2000. Released three years after the previous album, this one peaked at #2 on the Billboard Top New Age Albums chart.

This album continues somewhat in the flavor of Apurimac III, but is dedicated to ancient journeys of adventure and discovery. The musical concepts reflect on ancient rhythms and melodies, and depict ancient kingdoms, sea voyages, conquests and land explorations that cross continents.

Track listing 
 "Da Gama" (featuring Ottmar Liebert)
 "Conquistadores"
 "Land of the Midnight Sun"
 "Tigris & Euphrates"
 "Byzantium"
 "The Journeys of Marco Polo"
 "The Horsemen of Bulgar"
 "Kublai Khan"
 "The Crusades"

Album credits 
 Kristian Schultze – Arranger, keyboard, percussion,
 Manuel Lopez – Acoustic guitar
 Dan Selene – Executive producer
 Michael Holm – Arranger, producer, percussion, keyboard
 Johan Daansen – Guitar
 David Donnelly – Digital mixing
 Debra Holland – Percussion
 Ottmar Liebert – Guitar
 Klaus Strazicky – Mixing
 Cusco – Main performer
 Matt Marshall – Executive producer
 Biboul Darouiche – Percussion

References 

2000 albums
Cusco (band) albums